Ed Smith (born May 18, 1957) is a former professional American football linebacker who played in the National Football League (NFL) for the Baltimore Colts.

References

1957 births
American football linebackers
Baltimore Colts players
Vanderbilt Commodores football players
Living people
Chicago Blitz players
Arizona Wranglers players
Oakland Invaders players